Horspool is a surname. Notable people with the surname include:

David Horspool (born 1971), English historian and journalist
Nigel Horspool, Canadian computer scientist
Boyer–Moore–Horspool algorithm
Thomas Horspool (1830–?), British middle-distance runner